Dean Francis Mooney (born 24 July 1956) is an English former professional footballer who played in the Football League as a forward.

Career
Mooney went abroad to Norway in 1978 to play 3rd Division football with Haugar, joining fellow Englishmen Dennis Burnett (manager) and Barry Salvage. Mooney was a great hit from the start and was the club's top scorer for the two season he was at the club. After winning promotion to the second division in 1978, Haugar went all the way to the Norwegian Cup Final in 1979, and Mooney put them 1-0 up against Viking with a trademark header. A dubious penalty and an own-goal turned the match around after half-time, in what was to be Mooney's last game for the club. He then joined GAIS for the 1980 season, in which he played 21 matches and scored seven goals.

References

1956 births
Living people
Footballers from Paddington
English footballers
Association football forwards
Leyton Orient F.C. players
SK Haugar players
Walthamstow Avenue F.C. players
GAIS players
AFC Bournemouth players
Vasalunds IF players
Trowbridge Town F.C. players
Torquay United F.C. players
Road-Sea Southampton F.C. players
English Football League players
National League (English football) players